U-61 may refer to one of the following German submarines:

 , a Type U 57 submarine launched in 1916 and that served in the First World War until sunk on 26 March 1918
 During the First World War, Germany also had these submarines with similar names:
 , a Type UB III submarine launched in 1917 and sunk 29 November 1917
 , a Type UC II submarine launched in 1916 and scuttled on 26 July 1917
 , a Type IIC submarine that served in the Second World War until scuttled 2 May 1945

Submarines of Germany